Lillerød (sometimes named Allerød) is a Danish town, seat of the Allerød Municipality, in the Region Hovedstaden. Its population 1 January 2022 was of 16,741.

Geography
Lillerød is located in the northern side of the Zealand island, 27 km north-northwest (NNW) from Copenhagen and 26 km southwest (SW) from Helsingør.

Notable people 
 Aage Haugland (1944 – 2000 in Lillerød) a Danish operatic bass
 Jussi Adler-Olsen (born 1950) a writer of crime fiction, a publisher, editor and entrepreneur; lives in Allerød
 Henrik Fisker (born 1963 in Allerød) a Danish-American automotive designer and entrepreneur, lives in Los Angeles
 Peter Reichhardt (born 1967) a Danish actor and theatre director, director of the Mungo Park from 1998 to 2005
 Kate Hall (born 1983) a Danish-British singer, brought up in Lillerød, living in Germany
 Kaka, stage name of Rajabu Willer (born 1991 in Allerød) a reggae, dancehall and hip hop artist of Tanzanian descent

Sport 
 Martin Andersen (born 1986) a Danish footballer, 200 club caps
 Andreas Christensen (born 1996) a Danish footballer with Barcelona., played 31 games for Denmark.
 Rasmus Svane (born 1997 in Allerød) a German chess grandmaster

See also
Allerød station
Mungo Park, a theatre in Lillerød
 Lillerød Church

References

External links

Municipal seats in the Capital Region of Denmark
Municipal seats of Denmark
Cities and towns in the Capital Region of Denmark
Allerød Municipality